Broadcast Signal Intrusion is a 2021 horror suspense film  directed by Jacob Gentry. The film focuses on a man investigating the phenomenon of broadcast signal intrusions, which may be related to disappearances.

Synopsis
Set during 1999, James is archiving video tapes for a Chicago television station when he discovers that one contains a broadcast signal intrusion (BSI) where a disguised person acts strangely. The video is difficult to hear clearly, but this intrigues James. He chooses to investigate reports of a similar BSI that occurred during an episode of a sci-fi TV show, only to discover that the FCC took all of the station's copies. As he continues to search, James uncovers a possible conspiracy that is linked to the disappearance of several women, including his wife Hannah.

Cast 
 Harry Shum Jr. as James
 Chris Sullivan as Phreaker
 Steve Pringle as Dr. Stuart Lithgow
 Justin Welborn as Michael
Kelley Mack as Alice
Jennifer Jelsema as Nora
 James Swanton as Sal-E Sparx
 Michael B. Woods as MacAlister
 Arif Yampolsky as Chester
 Madrid St. Angelo as Proprietor

Production
Director Jacob Gentry was intrigued by the film's premise upon reading the script, as he found broadcast signal intrusions fascinating. Gentry has stated that creepypastas and videos such as Tara the Android were inspirations for the film, as were real life broadcast signal intrusions such as the 1987 Max Headroom signal hijacking and Alan J. Pakula’s films Klute, The Parallax View, and All The President’s Men.

Release
Broadcast Signal Intrusion premiered on March 16, 2021 at the South by Southwest Film Festival.
 Later, the movie was screened at multiple festivals, including Fantasia International Film Festival in Canada, London FrightFest Film Festival in the United Kingdom, and Sitges Fim Festival in Spain.

The movie was set for a limited theatrical and VOD release in the USA on October 22, 2021.

The movie can be streamed on AMC+.

Reception
Broadcast Signal Intrusion holds a rating of 69% on Rotten Tomatoes, based on 62 reviews, with the critics' consensus stating "Broadcast Signal Intrusion struggles to satisfactorily resolve its setup, but for much of its runtime, it offers an intriguing, well-acted diversion for horror fans." Common elements of praise centered on the film's atmosphere, which was praised by outlets such as Variety and RogerEbert.com. The performance of Harry Shum Jr. was also frequently singled out for praise. Horror website Bloody Disgusting rated the film at 2 1/2 out of 5 skulls, writing that it "wears its cinematic influences on its sleeves, delivering a heavily stylized mystery that rings hollow." Alexandra Heller-Nicholas of Alliance of Women Film Journalists pointed out that "This movie is no clear-cut, legible missing person mystery, as its ambitions are far, far greater than that: it is a film about grief, about obsession, and about our susceptibility to conspiracy theories to fill the void at a time when emptiness reigns supreme. And on this front, Broadcast Signal Intrusion – with all its ambiguities, ellipses and poetic elisions – is both unique and rewarding, if only for a more discerning audience who doesn’t want or need their themes spoon-fed to them."

References

External links
 

2021 films
2021 horror films
2020s mystery thriller films
American horror films
2020s English-language films
2020s American films